Minister responsible for the Status of Women may refer to:

 Minister responsible for the Status of Women (Canada), a position in the Canadian cabinet
 Minister responsible for the Status of Women (Manitoba), a position in the Executive Council of Manitoba